SRO Cinemaserye is a Philippine television drama anthology broadcast by GMA Network. It premiered on March 26, 2009. The show concluded on April 8, 2010 with a total of 35 episodes.

Premise
SRO Cinemaserye is a refreshing venture on drama anthologies in late-night primetime. Every story, which will run for eight weeks, boasts of a presentation with the cinematic quality of a motion picture. GMA Network artists will be put on spotlight on SRO Cinemaserye's finest episodes with heart-rending storyline and absorbing characterization.

Chapters

Ganti

Suspetsa

The Eva Castillo Story

Rowena Joy

Reunion

Moshi-Moshi, I Love You

Carenderia Queen

Exchange Gift

Meet the Fathers

Hot Mama

Ratings
According to AGB Nielsen Philippines' Mega Manila household television ratings, the pilot episode of SRO Cinemaserye earned an 18.3% rating. While the final episode scored a 15.7% rating.

Accolades

References

External links
 

2009 Philippine television series debuts
2010 Philippine television series endings
Filipino-language television shows
GMA Network original programming
Philippine anthology television series